This is a list of the most notable mass shootings in the United States that have occurred since 1920. Mass shootings are incidents involving several victims of firearm-related violence. The precise inclusion criteria are disputed, and there is no broadly accepted definition. Only shootings that have Wikipedia articles of their own are included in this list. Detailed lists of mass shootings can be found per year at their respective pages.

The Gun Violence Archive, a nonprofit research group that tracks shootings and their characteristics in the United States, defines a mass shooting as an incident in which four or more people, excluding the perpetrator(s), are shot in one location at roughly the same time. The Congressional Research Service narrows that definition further, only considering what it defines as "public mass shootings", and only considering victims as those who are killed, excluding any victims who survive. The Washington Post and Mother Jones use similar definitions, with the latter acknowledging that their definition "is a conservative measure of the problem", as many rampages with fewer fatalities occur. The crowdsourced Mass Shooting Tracker project uses a looser definition than the Gun Violence Archive's definition: four people shot in one incident regardless of the circumstances.

Larger documentation of mass shootings in the United States has occurred through independent and scholarly studies such as the Stanford University Mass Shootings in America Data Project.

Definitions 
There are varying definitions of a mass shooting. Listed roughly from most broad to most restrictive:

 Stanford MSA Data Project: three or more persons shot in one incident, excluding the perpetrator(s), at one location, at roughly the same time. Excluded are shootings associated with organized crime, gangs or drug wars.
 Mass Shooting Tracker: 4+ shot in one incident, at one location, at roughly the same time.
 Gun Violence Archive/Vox: 4+ shot in one incident, excluding the perpetrator(s), at one location, at roughly the same time.
 Mother Jones: 3+ shot and killed in one incident, excluding the perpetrator(s), at a public place, excluding gang-related killings.
 The Washington Post: 4+ shot and killed in one incident, excluding the perpetrator(s), at a public place, excluding gang-related killings.
 Congressional Research Service: 4+ shot and killed in one incident, excluding the perpetrator(s), at a public place, excluding gang-related killings, acts carried out that were inspired by criminal profit, and terrorism.

List of mass shootings (21st century)

2023

2022

2021

2020

2019

2018

2017

2016

2015

2014

2013

2012

2011

2010

2000s

Summary 
Summary list since 2018 which includes all mass shooting events, deaths, injuries, and victims documented across Wikipedia.

 as of Dec 31, 2021

List of mass shootings (20th century)

1990s

1980s

1970s

1960s

1950s

1940s

1930s

1920s

See also 
 List of school shootings in the United States by death toll
 List of school shootings in the United States (before 2000)
 List of school shootings in the United States (2000–present)
 List of mass shootings in the United States (2000–2009) 
 List of mass shootings in the United States in 2022 
 List of mass shootings in the United States in 2023 
 List of unsuccessful attacks related to schools
 Mass shootings in the United States#Deadliest mass shootings since 1949
 List of rampage killers in the United States
 List of countries by firearm-related death rate
 List of countries by intentional homicide rate
 Percent of households with guns by country
 Estimated number of civilian guns per capita by country
 Gun violence in the United States

Notes

References

External links 
 Gun Violence Archive Mass Shootings
 Mother Jones Mass Shootings
 Vox Mass Shootings
 Washington Post Mass Shootings

United States
 
Mass murder in the United States
School massacres in the United States

School shootings committed by pupils
United States crime-related lists